Notoglanidium is a genus of claroteid catfishes native to Africa. The formerly recognized genera Anaspidoglanis, Liauchenoglanis and  Platyglanis have all been merged into Notoglanidium.

Species
There are currently five recognized species in this genus:
 Notoglanidium akiri (Risch, 1987)
 Notoglanidium boutchangai (Thys van den Audenaerde, 1965)
 Notoglanidium depierrei (Daget, 1979)
 Notoglanidium maculatum (Boulenger, 1916)
 Notoglanidium macrostoma (Pellegrin, 1909) (Flatnose catfish)
 Notoglanidium pallidum T. R. Roberts & D. J. Stewart, 1976
 Notoglanidium pembetadi Vreven, Ibala Zamba, Mamonekene & Geerinckx, 2013
 Notoglanidium thomasi Boulenger, 1916
 Notoglanidium walkeri Günther, 1903

References

Claroteidae
Fish of Africa
Catfish genera
Freshwater fish genera
Taxa named by Albert Günther